Nicholas George Shadrin, born Nikolai Fedorovich Artamonov (1922 – December 1975), was a Soviet naval officer serving in Gdynia, Poland who defected to the United States of America in 1959.

Life
Shadrin was born in the Soviet Union in 1922. After joining the Soviet Navy he received advanced training in nuclear missiles, and at the age of 27 became the youngest destroyer captain in the fleet. Stationed in Gdynia, Poland in 1959, he fell in love with a Polish woman, Ewa Gora. With Navy restrictions and Gora's family's anti-communism making marriage impossible, the two defected by commandeering a naval launch to Sweden. The Central Intelligence Agency then brought Shadrin and Gora to the United States.

Shadrin's information proved particularly useful to the Office of Naval Intelligence. Working with the ONI under new identities, Shadrin gained an MA and PhD in engineering, and Gora opened a dental practice. Later, with ONI unable to gain Shadrin higher level security clearances, he was assigned to translation in the Defense Intelligence Agency.

Shadrin was engaged in various counter-intelligence assignments during the Cold War after being approached by the KGB in 1966. He disappeared on assignment in Vienna, Austria in December 1975, apparently kidnapped by KGB agents. Later, Oleg Kalugin stated that Shadrin had died an accidental death during the kidnapping, apparently of a heart attack.

See also
 List of Eastern Bloc defectors
On Artamamov's death : http://litresp.ru/chitat/ru/%D0%9B/lemehov-oleg-igorevich/perebezhchiki-zaochno-rasstrelyani

References

External links
http://www.mitchellspublications.com/ur/loc/hurth/sha/index.htm
http://www.cnn.com/SPECIALS/cold.war/episodes/21/spotlight/
 
 

1922 births
1975 deaths
American spies against the Soviet Union
Soviet Navy officers
Soviet defectors to the United States
People of the Defense Intelligence Agency
People of the Office of Naval Intelligence
People sentenced to death in absentia by the Soviet Union
People killed in KGB operations